NGC 4395 is a nearby low surface brightness spiral galaxy located about 14 million light-years (or 4.3 Mpc) from Earth in the constellation Canes Venatici. The nucleus of NGC 4395 is active and the galaxy is classified as a Seyfert Type I known for its very low-mass supermassive black hole.

Physical characteristics 
NGC 4395 has a halo that is about 8′ in diameter.  It has several patches of greater brightness running northwest to southeast.  The one furthest southeast is the brightest.  Three of the patches have their own NGC numbers: 4401, 4400, and 4399 running east to west.

The galaxy is highly unusual for Seyfert galaxies, because it does not have a bulge and is considered to be a dwarf galaxy.

Observational history 
NGC 4395 was imaged and classified as a "spiral nebula" in a 1920 paper by astronomer Francis G. Pease. Now, it is known to be a galaxy distinct from the Milky Way (see Great Debate). Along with several other nearby galaxies, resolved stars in NGC 4395 were used to measure the expansion rate of the Universe by Allan Sandage and Gustav Andreas Tammann in their 1974 paper. More recently, NGC 4395 was discovered to contain a very low-luminosity active galactic nucleus. Since then, its nucleus has been the subject of several academic papers and attempts to measure the mass of its central black hole.

Nucleus 
NGC 4395 is one of the least luminous and nearest Seyfert galaxies known. The nucleus of NGC 4395 is notable for containing one of the smallest supermassive black holes with a well-measured mass. The central black hole has a mass of "only" 300,000 . However, a recent study found a black hole mass of just 10,000 .  The low-mass black hole in NGC 4395 would make it a so-called "intermediate-mass black hole".

References

External links 
 
 NGC4395

Unbarred spiral galaxies
M94 Group
4395
07542
40596
Astronomical objects discovered in 1786
Canes Venatici